Cancionero is the name of an early-music ensemble based in the Sevenoaks and Maidstone area of Kent who perform the songs and dance music of the Middle Ages and also early Renaissance music from the Tudor court. 

Performances in period costume, encouraging audience dancing, at Penshurst Place and Tudor workshops for schools have been a regular feature. The group has also been featured on Radio Kent and on BBC Radio 4’s Open Country.

Current members
 Anthony Purnell (voice, recorders, wind, lute, psaltery, fiddle, crwth)
 Anne Purnell (voice, recorders, hurdy-gurdy, percussion)
 Brian White (voice, percussion)

External links 
Band Official site

Mixed early music groups